The Epsom Gold Cup was an English Thoroughbred horse race run annually at Epsom Downs Racecourse in Epsom, Surrey.

Raced in late May, it was open to horses age three and older. During the latter part of the 19th century, the race offered a purse of five hundred sovereigns in plate or specie and attracted top horses of the era.

It was superseded by the Coronation Cup in 1902.

Winners (partial list)
1810 - Tutelina
1811 - Marmion
1812 - Sorcery
1813 - Octavius
1814 - Aquarius
1825 - Wings
1827 - Tom Tit
1833 - Languish
1854 - Kingston 
1855 - Rataplan 
1856 - Typee 
1857 - Sir Colin 
1858 - Fisherman 
1859 - Fisherman 
1860 - Newcastle  
1861 - Surprise  
1862 - Asteroid 
1878 - Hampton
1879 - Parole
1880 - Fashion
1881 - Bend Or
1882 - Tristan
1883 - Tristan
1884 - St. Simon
1893 - Curio
1898 - Bay Ronald
1899 - Newhaven II

 Race known as Epsom Cup.

 Run over Great Metropolitan Handicap course - 2 miles 2 furlongs (3,621 metres).

References
 May 26, 1883 New York Times article on the Epsom Gold Cup (PDF)
 List of Coronation Cup and Epsom Gold Cup winners

Flat races in Great Britain
Epsom Downs Racecourse
Discontinued horse races